Chaetomnion is a genus of green algae in the family Chaetophoraceae. The only known species in the genus is Chaetomnion pyriferum.

References

External links

Chaetophorales genera
Chaetophoraceae
Monotypic algae genera